New World in the Morning is a studio album by Roger Whittaker released in 1971. It featured some of his most popular songs, including "The Last Farewell", "A Special Kind of Man", the title track "New World in the Morning" (#12 US Easy Listening; UK #17) and "Streets of London".

History
Whittaker released the album in 1971 at the peak of his popularity. It included the hit "The Last Farewell", which won Whittaker an Ivor Novello Award for songwriting. "No Blade of Grass" was the title song for the film No Blade of Grass. 

The album has never been released on CD, and current digital versions of the album's most popular songs have been re-recordings done by Whittaker in the 1980s and 1990s.

In the US and Canada, most of these songs appeared on Whittaker's 1971 album A Special Kind of Man, which was released by RCA Records. Included on the North American release were the songs "Why?", "What Love Is" and "Mexican Whistler", while "New World in the Morning", "From Both Sides Now" and "Streets of London" were omitted.

The song "New World in the Morning" had earlier been released by Hagood Hardy in June 1970.

Track listing

"Candy Cloud"
"A Special Kind of Man"
"No Blade of Grass"
"Moonshine"
"Morning Please Don't Come"
"New World in the Morning"
"My Kind"
"The Last Farewell"
"From Both Sides Now"
"Paradise"
"Streets of London"
"He Starts Below"

Charts

References

External links
The Ivor Novello Awards
Whittaker's website

1971 albums
EMI Columbia Records albums